Lee's Guide to Interstellar Adventure is a 1983 role-playing game supplement for Traveller published by Gamelords.

Contents
Lee's Guide to Interstellar Adventure is a book that provides a planetary description and adventure scenarios for 11 worlds.

Publication history
Lee's Guide to Interstellar Adventure was written by Gregory P. Lee and was published in 1983 by Gamelords as a digest-sized 48-page book.

Reception
Roger E. Moore reviewed Lee's Guide to Interstellar Adventure, Vol. 1 in Ares Special Edition #2 and commented that "Lee's Guide makes an excellent addition to a Traveller game referee's library, and referees of other SF role-playing games might well be advised to pick this booklet up and adapt the situations to their own game campaigns. I highly recommend it."

Tony Watson reviewed Lee's Guide to Interstellar Adventure in The Space Gamer No. 72. Watson commented that "all very good [...] A solid, original effort."

Reviews
 Different Worlds #46 (May/June, 1987)

References

Role-playing game supplements introduced in 1983
Traveller (role-playing game) supplements